Dario Damjanović (born 23 July 1981) is a Bosnian professional football manager and former player.

Club career
Damjanović started his career at football clubs in Bosnia and Herzegovina and Serbia, but signed with Croatian club Hajduk Split in the summer of 2004.

On 31 January 2009, he moved from Luch-Energiya of the Russian Premier League to German side 1. FC Kaiserslautern.

In September 2011, Damjanović returned to Bosnia and signed with Bosnian Premier League club Čelik Zenica.

International career
Damjanović made his debut for Bosnia and Herzegovina in a February 2004 friendly match away against Macedonia and has earned a total of 17 caps, scoring 2 goals. On 26 March 2008, he scored two goals for Bosnia in a friendly against Macedonia. These were his first two goals ever for the national team. His final international game was an August 2009 friendly against Iran.

Career statistics
Scores and results table. Bosnia and Herzegovina's goal tally first.

Managerial statistics

Honours

Player
Modriča
Bosnian Cup: 2003–04

Hajduk Split
1. HNL: 2004–05

Jagodina
Serbian Cup: 2012–13

References

External links
 

1981 births
Living people
People from Gradačac
Croats of Bosnia and Herzegovina
Association football midfielders
Bosnia and Herzegovina footballers
Bosnia and Herzegovina international footballers
FK Radnički Obrenovac players
FK Modriča players
HNK Hajduk Split players
FC Luch Vladivostok players
1. FC Kaiserslautern players
NK Čelik Zenica players
FK Novi Pazar players
FK Jagodina players
TSW Pegasus FC players
OFK Beograd players
NK Zvijezda Gradačac players
Premier League of Bosnia and Herzegovina players
First League of the Republika Srpska players
Croatian Football League players
Russian Premier League players
2. Bundesliga players
Serbian SuperLiga players
Hong Kong Premier League players
First League of the Federation of Bosnia and Herzegovina players
Bosnia and Herzegovina expatriate footballers
Expatriate footballers in Serbia and Montenegro
Bosnia and Herzegovina expatriate sportspeople in Serbia and Montenegro
Expatriate footballers in Croatia
Bosnia and Herzegovina expatriate sportspeople in Croatia
Expatriate footballers in Russia
Bosnia and Herzegovina expatriate sportspeople in Russia
Expatriate footballers in Germany
Bosnia and Herzegovina expatriate sportspeople in Germany
Expatriate footballers in Hong Kong
Bosnia and Herzegovina expatriate sportspeople in Hong Kong
Bosnia and Herzegovina football managers
NK Zvijezda Gradačac managers
HNK Orašje managers
NK Marsonia managers
Bosnia and Herzegovina expatriate football managers
Expatriate football managers in Croatia